Francisco "Frank" Morán Benavides (c. 1880 – death date unknown) was a Cuban baseball outfielder and catcher in the Cuban League and Negro leagues. 

A native of Matanzas, Cuba, Morán was the younger brother of fellow ballplayer Carlos Morán. He played with several teams from 1899 to 1911, including San Francisco, Almendares, Carmelita, Habana, Cuban Stars (West), and Club Fé. He also played in the 1905 and 1907 Cuban-American Major League Clubs Series.

External links

1880s births
Cuban League players
Habana players
Almendares (baseball) players
Club Fé players
Carmelita players
Cuban Stars (West) players
San Francisco (baseball) players
Year of death unknown
Cuban expatriate baseball players in the United States